1740 Paavo Nurmi, provisional designation , is rare-type asteroid from the inner regions of the asteroid belt, approximately 13 kilometers in diameter.

It was discovered on 18 October 1939, by Finnish astronomer Yrjö Väisälä at Turku Observatory in Southwest Finland. It was named after Finnish distance runner Paavo Nurmi.

Orbit and classification 

Paavo Nurmi orbits the Sun in the inner main-belt at a distance of 2.0–2.9 AU once every 3 years and 10 months (1,415 days). Its orbit has an eccentricity of 0.19 and an inclination of 2° with respect to the ecliptic.

This observation, however, remained unused and the body's observation arc begins with its official discovery observation at Turku in 1939.

Physical characteristics 

On the Tholen taxonomic scheme, Paavo Nurmi has been characterized as a rare F-type asteroid, a subtype of the carbonaceous asteroids, which are common in the outer, but not in the inner main-belt.

Paavo Nurmi has an absolute magnitude of 13.24. According to the survey carried out by NASA's Wide-field Infrared Survey Explorer with its subsequent NEOWISE mission, the asteroid measures 12.76 kilometers in diameter, and its surface has an albedo of 0.046. As of 2017, its rotation period and shape remain unknown.

Naming 

This minor planet was named for famed Turku-born Finnish distance runner Paavo Nurmi, also known as The Flying Finn, who won nine Olympic gold medals and set 22 official world records at distances between 1,500 metres and 20 kilometres. The official naming citation was published by the Minor Planet Center on 1 April 1980.

References

External links 
 Asteroid Lightcurve Database (LCDB), query form (info )
 Dictionary of Minor Planet Names, Google books
 Asteroids and comets rotation curves, CdR – Observatoire de Genève, Raoul Behrend
 Discovery Circumstances: Numbered Minor Planets (1)-(5000) – Minor Planet Center
 
 

001740
Discoveries by Yrjö Väisälä
Named minor planets
1740
001740
19391018